Zdzisław I was a 12th-century Archbishop of Gniezno, Poland.

He was Archbishop from before 26 April 1177 till after 28 March 1181.

He is mentioned in a documented on April 26, 1177 as a witness for the Lubiąż Abbey.  He presided over an assembly at Easter 1179 and the Convention of the Polish bishops and barons organised by Casimir II the Just in 1180. He is mentioned in a Bull of Pope Alexander III dated March 28, 1181. The date of his death is not known but was probably in the 1180s.

The date of his death is unknown.

See also
 The Gniezno Doors may have been installed in his time.

External links
 Virtual tour Gniezno Cathedral

References 

Archbishops of Gniezno
12th-century births
1180s deaths